Thomas Keys may refer to:

Thomas Keyes, Royal Gatekeeper to Elizabeth I of England and husband of Lady Mary Grey, sister of Queen Jane Grey
Thomas Keys Residence, house in Minnesota, USA, built in 1950
Thomas Keys (MP) for Hythe (UK Parliament constituency)

See also
Thomas Hewitt Key, English scholar